Brigitte Engerer (27 October 1952 – 23 June 2012) was a French pianist.

Biography
Born in Tunis, French Tunisia, Engerer started piano lessons at the age of four, and by the age of six was performing in public. When she was 11 her family moved to France and she entered the Paris Conservatoire to study under Lucette Descaves. In 1968, aged 15, she was unanimously awarded a first prize in piano, and the following year she won the Concours International Marguerite Long-Jacques Thibaud. Engerer was subsequently invited to undertake further training at the Moscow Tchaikovsky Conservatory where she joined the class of Stanislav Neuhaus, who said she was "one of the most brilliant and most original pianists of her generation". Though her scholarship was originally for one year, she loved Russia so much that she studied there for nine years.

In 1980, her career took a decisive turn when Herbert von Karajan invited her to play with the Berlin Philharmonic. She subsequently received engagements with the Boston Symphony Orchestra, the New York Philharmonic and the Orchestre de Paris under Daniel Barenboim, and she was a favourite of conductors such as Mstislav Rostropovich and Zubin Mehta. Her subsequent career was divided between giving recitals and teaching at the Paris Conservatoire. Her last concert took place on 12 June 2012 at the prestigious Théâtre des Champs-Elysées, 50 years after playing there for the first time. The performance featured the work of Schumann. She died less than two weeks later, on 23 June, after a several year struggle against cancer. She was 59 years of age.

She had been married to the writer Yann Queffélec, with whom she had a daughter, Leonore.  She later married Xavier Fourteau, and together they had a son, Harold Fourteau.

Selected discography

 Tchaikovsky Piano Concerto No. 1 and Schumann Piano Concerto in A minor with the Royal Philharmonic Orchestra/Emmanuel Krivine
 The Complete Nocturnes by Frédéric Chopin
 Sonatas by Beethoven, Grieg and Schumann with Olivier Charlier
 Work for two pianos and piano duet of Rachmaninoff with Oleg Maisenberg and Boris Berezovsky
 A German Requiem by Brahms in a version for two pianos and chorus (London version) with Boris Berezovsky and Accentus Choir conducted by Laurence Equilbey
 Schumann's Carnaval and Scenes from Childhood
 Concertos by Clara and Robert Schumann; Orchestre régional de Cannes-Provence-Alpes-Côte d'Azur/Philippe Bender
 The works for cello and piano by Chopin; with Henri Demarquette
 Modest Mussorgsky: Pictures at an Exhibition and Night on Bald Mountain, Harmonia Mundi, 2006
 Childhood memories (Russian Music); booklet essay by Yann Queffélec (2007 Mirare) ("Choc" du Monde de la Musique)
 L'invitation au Voyage (French music) with Henry Demarquette ("Choc" du Monde de la Musique)
Camille Saint-Saëns, Piano concert n°2 & n°5, Brigitte Engerer, piano, Ensemble Orchestral de Paris, conductor Andrea Quin (with concerto n°5). CD Mirare 2008
Liszt: Harmonies poétiques et religieuses (2010, Mirare MIR 084)

Filmography

Brigitte Engerer images appear repeatedly in Sophie Laloy's film Je te mangerais (released 11 March 2009), in which she is admired by Mary, the main character. She also plays the classical piano pieces heard in the film.

International awards and honours

 Competition Marguerite Long-Jacques Thibaud
 Tchaikovsky Competition in Moscow
 Queen Elisabeth Competition of Belgium
 Grand Prix du Disque for her recording with Philips of Carnival op. 9 and the Carnival of Vienna Robert Schumann
 Corresponding member of the Institut de France, Academy of Fine Arts
 Win honor for lifetime achievement, the Victoires de la musique 2011 classic

Decorations

 Chevalier of the Legion of Honour
 Commander of the Order of Merit
 Commander of Arts and Letters

Quotation
"I need the transparency of the French piano — and, more important, the rationality of French philosophy. But I needed some of the Russian craziness in my playing. I still do."

References

1952 births
2012 deaths
Conservatoire de Paris alumni
20th-century French women classical pianists
21st-century French women classical pianists
Long-Thibaud-Crespin Competition prize-winners
French music educators
Piano pedagogues
People from Tunis
Chevaliers of the Légion d'honneur
Commandeurs of the Ordre des Arts et des Lettres
Commanders of the Ordre national du Mérite
Deaths from cancer in France
Women music educators